Jagir (Hindi ), also known as Teen Murti (Bengali ), is a 1984 Indian Dacoit Western film directed by Pramod Chakravorty, starring Dharmendra, Mithun Chakraborty, Zeenat Aman,  Pran, Danny Denzongpa, Shoma Anand and Amrish Puri. Two language versions were released, a Hindi version as Jagir and a Bengali version as Teen Murti. It was the highest-grossing Indian film of 1984.

Plot 
Pramod Chakravorty's multi-starrer, Jagir is the story of three musketeers - Shankar, Sangha, and Danny, who fight to help the needy and punish the greedy. Many years ago, Maharaj Shoor Veer Singh gets killed by a dacoit Lakhan, when he tries to stop him from robbing his royal locket, which concealed the map to the treasure of Anjangadh. Maharaj's loyal Mangal Singh helps the Maharaj's son escape the evil dacoit Lakhan. An accident causes the Maharaj's son to lose his memory. he gets raised in humble surroundings as Shankar, unaware of the precious locket he wore around his neck. Over the time, Lakhan becomes an industrialist and called himself Thakur Saheb. Despite his wealth, he continues to dream of attaining the treasures of Anjangadh that are guarded by the watchful eyes of Shamsher Bahadur - a falcon . Shankar - the true heir and Seema, Sangha, and Asha, along with Danny, set out to protect the treasures of Anjangadh from falling into the hands of evil.

Cast 

Dharmendra as Shankar
Mithun Chakraborty as Sanga
Danny Denzongpa as Danny
Pran as Mangal Singh
Zeenat Aman as Seema
Shoma Anand as Asha
Beena Banerjee as Monica Amrish Puri as Lakhan Singh / Thakur
Ranjeet as Ranjeet Singh
Sujit Kumar as Dacoit
Praveen Kumar as Django D'Costa

 Iftekhar as IG 
 Kamal Kapoor as Maharaj Shoor Veer Singh
 Bharat Bhushan as Dr. Bakshi
 Priti Sapru as Lily
 Birbal as Bahadur
 Asit Sen as Guard
 Ashalata Wabgoankar as Shankar Saviour
Azaad Irani as Azaad
MacMohan as Mac
Bob Christo as Bob

Soundtrack 
Lyrics: Anand Bakshi

Soundtrack (Tin Murti) (Bengali)

Box office 
In the Soviet Union, it was the top-grossing Indian film of 1986, with 38million admissions at the Soviet box office. This was equivalent to an estimated million Rblss in 1986, or  adjusted for inflation in 2017.

References

External links 
 

1984 films
1980s Hindi-language films
1984 Western (genre) films
Films scored by R. D. Burman
Indian Western (genre) films
Films directed by Pramod Chakravorty